Simon Westlund (born July 29, 1994 in Trollhättan) is a speedcuber from Sweden. He is the former megaminx single world record holder. Westlund participated in a talent show Talang 2011, where he won and received the 500,000 SEK prize money as a result. He was one of the best "cubers" for the megaminx event in between 2011-2012 in which he got 4 world records in the event.
He has attended 46 competitions in the WCA since his first in 2008

External links
 Simon on WCA

Swedish speedcubers
Living people
1994 births
Talang (Swedish TV series) contestants
People from Trollhättan
Sportspeople from Västra Götaland County